FC LeRK Brno was a Czech football club from the city of Brno. The club existed from 1910 until 1995, playing a single season in the Czechoslovak First League in 1961/62 under the name of Spartak Brno KPS. In the same season, the club took part in the 1961–62 Inter-Cities Fairs Cup. Following the breakup of Czechoslovakia, the club played in the Czech 2. Liga for two seasons. It then merged with SK Prostějov in 1995.

Historical names

 Sparta Královo Pole (1910–22)
 SK Královo Pole (1922–48)
 Sokol GZ Královo Pole (1948–53)
 Spartak Královo Pole Brno (1953–61)
 Spartak Brno KPS (1961–63)
 TJ KPS Brno (1963–93)
 FC LeRK Brno (1993–95)

References

Brno, Spartak Kps
Brno, Spartak Kps
Brno, Spartak Kps
Brno, Spartak Kps
Brno, Spartak Kps
Sport in Brno